Bávaro is an area of Punta Cana, located in La Altagracia province, the easternmost province of the Dominican Republic. Bavaro was originally developed as a town for resort workers together with the resort area and tourist region of Punta Cana. As hotels started to rise along the east coast, north from Punta Cana, Bavaro itself became a center of services.

Road network
Other beaches to the North include Uvero Alto beach, Roco Ki beach, La Vacama beach. Bavaro has  of sea shore.

At the center of Bávaro is the crossroad of Friusa. Beyond the crossroad Verón, on the right side is an important road to Cabeza de Toro, most eastern tip of the island of Hispaniola, and the Dominican Republic as well. The next crossroad, El Coco Loco, leads to the Friusa Centar and further points to the north.

Infrastructure
The electricity is powered by Consorcio Energetico Punta Cana Macao (CEPM), a wind and solar energy producer led by US-based Argentine businessman Rolando Gonzalez-Bunster.

Street view

Hotels and bars

The oldest hotel in the area, Barcelo, is past the crossroad Coco Loco and Villas Bavaro I and II. One of the newest hotels is the Now Larimar Resort. The Cocotal Golf and Country Club is in front of two Melia Hotels (Paradisus Palma Real, Meliá Caribe Tropical) and the shopping mall, Plaza Palma Real.

Beyond the Melia Hotels is El Cortecito, the first sand road connecting Punta Cana International Airport. The oldest building in Los Corales (where El Cortecito starts) is Pirata, now home to two beach bars: Soles and Umi.

Real estate
Tourism in Bávaro has been developing at a rapid pace. The best examples are Los Corales, Cocotal and El Cortecito, among other options. All are just minutes away from the Punta Cana International Airport, where most visitors fly in.

Other facilities

The next crossroad, Plaza Bavaro, is full of gift shops, and can take you to discothèque Mangu and Areito, as well as to the White Sands golf course. 

Office of Politur (Turistic Policia or Tourist Police) is next to the bus station, close to Friusa. On the part of the road from Plaza Bavaro to Friusa, there are hospitals and shopping malls with bars and restaurants. Bavaro ends at the crossroad to Macao Beach, where the Hotel RIU is located.

Beaches

References

Milos Korac Real Estate Punta Cana,

External links

Beaches of the Dominican Republic
Populated places in La Altagracia Province